Jan Šrámek (born 4 September 1945) is a Czech former pair skater who represented Czechoslovakia. With his sister, Bohunka Šrámková, he is the 1968 Winter Universiade champion and 1967 Czechoslovak national champion. The pair placed tenth at the 1968 Winter Olympics in Grenoble, France. They also finished in the top ten at three ISU Championships – 1967 European Championships in Ljubljana, Yugoslavia; 1967 World Championships in Vienna, Austria; and 1968 World Championships in Geneva, Switzerland.

Competitive highlights 
 Pairs with Šrámková

References 

1945 births
Czech male pair skaters
Czechoslovak male pair skaters
Figure skaters at the 1968 Winter Olympics
Living people
Olympic figure skaters of Czechoslovakia
Sportspeople from Ostrava
Universiade medalists in figure skating
Universiade gold medalists for Czechoslovakia
Competitors at the 1968 Winter Universiade